Darab (also Romanized as Dārāb) is a village in Ban Zardeh Rural District, in the Central District of Dalahu County, Kermanshah Province, Iran. At the 2006 census, its population was 714, in 132 families.

References 

Populated places in Dalahu County